Sukhjivan Singh Chungh (born March 4, 1992) is a Canadian football offensive lineman for the BC Lions of the Canadian Football League (CFL). He played CIS football at University of Calgary and attended Terry Fox Secondary School in Port Coquitlam, British Columbia.

Early years
Chungh's parents immigrated to Canada from India. He began playing football in the ninth grade and later won back-to-back lineman of the year honours at Terry Fox Secondary School. He also set school records in several lifts like the bench press and squat. Chungh helped the team win provincial titles in 2006, 2007, and 2008. He was also named to Team World at the 2010 USA vs. The World football challenge in January 2010.

University career
Chungh played CIS football for the Calgary Dinos from 2011 to 2014. He redshirted in 2010. He became a starter in 2012 while also earning CanWest All-Star and CIS All-Canadian honors in 2013 and 2014.

Professional career

Winnipeg Blue Bombers
Chungh was invited to the NFL's Super Regional Combine in Arizona in 2015. He was drafted by the Winnipeg Blue Bombers of the CFL with the second overall pick in the 2015 CFL Draft. He played in eighteen games for the Blue Bombers during the 2015 season.  Shortly after the 2015 CFL draft, the Bombers signed Chungh to a two-year contract, which extended through the 2015 and 2016 CFL seasons.  On November 14, 2016, Chungh confirmed that he signed a new one-year contract to play the 2017 CFL season with the Bombers. Over four years, he played and started in 69 regular season games for the team. He became a free agent upon the expiry of his contract on February 12, 2019.

BC Lions
On February 12, 2019, it was announced that Chungh had signed a three-year contract with his hometown BC Lions. His first year with the Lions was best with injuries as he played and started in just eight games in 2019. He did not play in 2020 due to the cancellation of the 2020 CFL season. In 2021, he played and started in all 14 regular season games at right guard.

References

External links

BC Lions bio
Just Sports Stats
NFL Draft Scout

Living people
1992 births
Canadian football offensive linemen
Calgary Dinos football players
Winnipeg Blue Bombers players
Players of Canadian football from British Columbia
People from Port Coquitlam
Canadian people of Indian descent
BC Lions players